The Regional Municipality of Halton, or Halton Region, is a regional municipality in Ontario, Canada, located in the Golden Horseshoe of Southern Ontario. It comprises the city of Burlington and the towns of Oakville, Milton, and Halton Hills. Policing in the Region is provided by the Halton Regional Police Service. The regional council's headquarters are located in Oakville. Burlington and Oakville are largely urban and suburban, while the towns of Milton and Halton Hills are more rural.

Halton is part of the Greater Toronto Area (GTA), although it is the only regional municipality in the GTA that is not situated directly adjacent to Toronto’s city proper. However, the region is split between the census metropolitan areas (CMAs) of Toronto and Hamilton. Burlington is part of the Hamilton CMA, while the rest of the region is part of the Toronto CMA.

Halton experienced a growth rate of 17.1% between 2001 and 2006, and 14.2% between 2006 and 2011, giving it one of the highest growth rates in the country. Despite the unprecedented growth in residential development, agriculture and protected lands along the Niagara Escarpment are still the predominant land uses in the region. Halton has been ranked by Maclean's national crime ranking report as being the "safest place to live" in the GTA and one of the top five in Canada.

History
The Regional Municipality of Halton was established on 1 January 1974 as the successor to the former Halton County by the Regional Municipality of Halton Act, 1973. From 1 January 2003, it has been governed by the Municipal Act, 2001.

Until the 2000 municipal elections, the chairperson of the regional council had been appointed by the Ontario government. From that date, it has been an elective position. Joyce Savoline was the last appointed chairperson, and was elected and reelected until her retirement from the position in 2006. The current
regional chairperson is Gary Carr.

At the 2021 Census, the region reported a population of 596,637 residents and its projected population estimate for 2041 exceeded one million. The unemployment rate was 5.3% during the year. The average household income was very high, at $139,000.

Regional council

The council consists of the elected chairperson, the mayors of the local municipalities, and regional councillors elected by wards from the local municipalities (who also sit on their respective municipal councils).

The current membership of the council is as follows:

Regional services 
Halton Region provides the following services to its communities:Economic development
Emergency planning
Regional planning and growth management
Recycling and waste
Regional roads
Sewage (wastewater) collection systems and treatment plants
Water purification plants and distribution systems
Housing supports and services
Children and parenting
Employment and financial assistance
Ontario Works (social services)
Services for seniors
Paramedic services
Public health
Immunizations and preventable diseases
Food safety
Halton Regional Police Service

In 2018, the Region had 27 emergency vehicles and 254 paramedics; the latter answered 53,094 paramedic calls. The Police service had 721 police officers; its 911 call centre received 121,971 reports of emergency.

Demographics

Economy

Labour force

Agriculture

x = suppressed for reasons of confidentiality

Halton's agricultural sector is supported by regional infrastructure such as the Port of Hamilton which is a growing agri-food hub for the import of agricultural inputs and the export of local crops.

2018 economic report
The 2018 budget document contains additional specifics and updates as to the Region's finances. In that year, gross revenues were $1.2 billion while operating expenses totaled $821.5 million for a net revenue of $350.2 million, an increase of 1.2% over the previous year. The increase was mostly due to increases in grants and taxes. The Region included over 13,200 companies and employed over 229,000 persons. The credit rating of AAA was confirmed by S&P Global Ratings and Moody's Investors Service.

Geography

While the urban areas of Burlington, Oakville and Milton are experiencing rapid growth, there is still a significant proportion of the Region that is still rural, most of which is protected as part of the provincial Greenbelt or as part of the Niagara Escarpment Plan.

Halton is somewhat unusual, in that it has three distinct climate zones within its relatively small area, which are as follows:

 Zone 5a - Halton Hills lying to the north of the Niagara Escarpment, together with the Town of Milton within the Grand River watershed
 Zone 5b - the remainder of Halton Hills, Milton north of Derry Road, and that part of Burlington lying north of the Niagara Escarpment
 Zone 6a - the southern remainder of the Region

Climate charts

See also
 List of municipalities in Ontario
 Halton Region Conservation Authority
 Halton District School Board
 Halton Catholic District School Board
 List of numbered roads in Halton Region
 List of secondary schools in Ontario#Regional Municipality of Halton

Notes

References

External links

 
Halton